Petr Pála (born 2 October 1975) is a tennis coach and former professional tennis player from the Czech Republic. Together with Pavel Vízner he reached the men's doubles final of the 2001 French Open but lost to Indians Mahesh Bhupathi and Leander Paes (6–7, 3–6).

Pála was coached by his father František, who was a professional tennis player on the ATP tour.

Pála never had the opportunity to do his singles ability justice on the ATP Tour due to injury. When he recovered from these injuries he returned immediately to the doubles tour, but could not gain entry to official ATP matches.

Pála became the non-playing captain of the Czech Republic Fed Cup team in December 2007. Since then, he has led the Fed Cup team to world titles in 2011, 2012, 2014, 2015, 2016 and 2018, becoming the most successful Fed Cup team captain of all time.

Grand Slam finals

Doubles: 1 runner-up

Performance timelines

Doubles

Mixed doubles

ATP career finals

Doubles: 16 (7 titles, 9 runner-ups)

ATP Challenger and ITF Futures Finals

Doubles: 20 (10–10)

References

External links
 
 

Czech male tennis players
Czech tennis coaches
Tennis players from Prague
1975 births
Living people